On 1 June 2001, a Hamas-affiliated Islamist terrorist blew himself up outside the Dolphinarium discotheque on the beachfront in Tel Aviv, Israel, killing 21 Israelis, 16 of whom were teenagers. The majority of the victims were Israeli teenage girls, whose families had recently immigrated from the former Soviet Union.

Attack
Suicide bomber Saeed Hotari was standing in line on a Friday night in front of the Dolphinarium, when the area was packed with teenagers. Most of the crowd were young people from Russian-speaking families from the former Soviet Union, who were waiting for admission to a dance party at the Dolphin disco, and others were in line to enter the adjacent nightclub. Survivors of the attack later described how the young Palestinian bomber appeared to taunt his victims before the explosion, wandering among them dressed in a disguise that led his victims to mistake him for an Orthodox Jew from Asia. Before detonating his bomb, he banged a drum packed with explosives and ball-bearings, while taunting his victims in Hebrew with the words "Something's going to happen". At 23:27, he detonated his explosive device. Witnesses claimed that body parts lay all over the area, and that bodies were piled one above another on the sidewalk before being collected. Many civilians in the vicinity of the bombing rushed to assist emergency services.

The suicide bombing followed a failed attack attempt on the same target five months earlier.

Perpetrators
Both Islamic Jihad and a group calling itself "Hezbollah-Palestine" originally claimed responsibility for the suicide bombing, only to later retract the claims. Later on it was revealed that the attack was carried out by Saeed Hotari, aged 22, a militant allegedly linked to the Palestinian Islamist militant group Hamas.

Official reactions

Israeli officials called the attack a "massacre". President of the Palestinian Authority Yasser Arafat condemned the attack and called for a cease-fire. UN Secretary-General Kofi Annan stated that he "condemns this indiscriminate terrorist attack in the strongest possible terms." and that the attack "underlines the urgency of breaking the cycle of violence." The Kuwaiti Foreign Minister and acting Premier Sabah Al-Ahmad Al-Jaber Al-Sabah stated that he does not support Palestinian suicide bombings against civilians. U.S. President George W. Bush stated that he condemns the attack in the strongest terms and that "There is no justification for senseless attacks against innocent civilians."

Aftermath

After the attack many in the Israeli public demanded a harsh military retaliation; nevertheless, Prime Minister Ariel Sharon decided to not take any immediate retaliatory actions. U.S. and other governments applied heavy diplomatic pressure on Israel to refrain from action. Nevertheless, the attack was later on noted as one of the reasons cited by the Israeli government for building the Israeli West Bank barrier.

In Ramallah dozens of Palestinians celebrated in the streets and fired in the air as a sign of celebration. The bomber, Saeed Hotari, was praised as a martyr by his father. U.S. President George W. Bush demanded that Yasser Arafat condemn the terrorist act, which he did. The next day, Israeli-Arabs barricaded themselves in the Hassan Bek Mosque opposite the Dolphinarium site and threw objects at the police.

According to the Intelligence and Terrorism Information Center, an Israeli-based organization with close ties to the IDF, among the materials seized by the IDF in the course of Operation Defensive Shield were two documents issued by the Martyrs' Families and Injured Care Establishment, which is under the authority of the Palestinian National Authority's Ministry of Social Affairs. The documents detail the transfer of US$2,000 to the father of the suicide bomber, who was living in Jordan at that time (18 June 2001). According to the Intelligence and Terrorism Information Center, the transfer was made despite the suicide bomber's Hamas affiliation, despite the father's public support of the suicide bombing attack, and despite Arafat's public condemnation of the bombing.

Dolphinarium site 

Opened in 1981, the Dolphinarium was originally a mixed-use entertainment venue with the main attraction being shows of captive dolphins. The project was the initiative of architect Nahum Zolotov, who came up with the idea of a dolphin show in Tel Aviv and lined up Israeli businessmen and South African investors in support of his plan. The business ran into financial trouble after the South African investors were found to be using it as a money laundering operation and forced to leave the project. Without their financial support, the cost of running the expensive dolphin shows proved to be unsustainable and the business closed in 1985. The building was then used by a succession of businesses including nightclubs, movie theaters, catering halls, and sport shops, but with limited success. By 1993, the municipality was looking to demolish the structure. After the bombing, the Dolphinarium discotheque was abandoned and ended up being covered with graffiti. Its final use was as a surfing school. The building remained on the Tel Aviv beachfront until its demolition in May 2018.

For many years, the victims' families campaigned to permanently preserve the ruined building as a monument to the attack. Eventually, the building was demolished in order to extend the promenade along the coast. Memorial services to the victims of the attack were held every year at the site by friends and family of the victims.

See also
 Civilian casualties in the Second Intifada
 Shevah Mofet – high school in Tel Aviv where seven of the killed teenagers and many of the injured studied
 Israeli casualties of war
 Palestinian political violence

References

External links

Tel-Aviv suicide bombing at the Dolphin disco, Israeli Ministry of Foreign Affairs; accessed 2 September 2015
 At Least 17 Dead In Tel Aviv Suicide Bombing, Times Daily, 2 June 2001
 At Least 17 Dead, 86 Wounded In Tel Aviv Beachfront Bombing, The Item, 2 June 2001
 Eyewitness accounts from the scene of the massacre, Ynet, 2 June 2001 (Hebrew)
 Inside the mind of a suicide bomber, ABC News, 6 December 2001
 Devotion, desire drive youths to 'martyrdom', USA Today; 26 June 2001
 Driver of the Dolphinarium attack terrorist – charged with homicide, Ynet, 10 July 10, 2001 (in Hebrew)

Suicide bombings in 2001
Terrorist incidents in Israel in 2001
Massacres in 2001
Israeli casualties in the Second Intifada
Massacres in Israel during the Israeli–Palestinian conflict
Hamas suicide bombings
Terrorist incidents in Tel Aviv
2000s crimes in Tel Aviv
Attacks on music venues
Attacks on nightclubs
June 2001 events in Asia
June 2001 crimes
Murdered Israeli children
Building bombings in Israel
Islamic terrorism in Israel